EP08 (also manufactured as Pafawag 102E) is the name for a Polish electric locomotive used by the Polish railway operator Polskie Koleje Państwowe (PKP), produced between 1972 and 1976 in Pafawag, Wrocław. The construction is based on the EU07 locomotive.

History
In the 1970s PKP intended to increase speed of Polish passenger trains, which resulted mainly in building CMK line (Trunk Line) and the modernisation of EU05 locomotives into EP05 series. Meanwhile a project was opened to introduce new electric locomotives able to pull trains with speed exceeding , based on British EU06 and local EU07 machines.

In 1972 the first prototype left Pafawag works and until 1976 a total number of 15 units had been produced. Further production was ceased due to huge orders of freight locomotives and insufficient funds for importing foreign parts for the machine.

All machines of this class station in Warsaw but as top speed on Warsaw-Poznań line had been increased to  they are no longer used on regular basis and serve as auxiliary machines, mostly pulling trains from Warsaw to Zakopane.
Since 2015, EP08 began receiving major repair and modernizations in ZNTK Oleśnica, later Olkol Oleśnica. Halogen headlights were installed, air conditioning added, modern radiotelephones added (except 001), multiple steering parts removed (again except 001)

Technical data
As the EP08 is tightly based on EU06 and EU07 locomotives it is important to compare those series while writing about technical features. EP08 is a Bo′Bo′ locomotive with four axles mounted on two bogies. Each axle is propelled separately by an EE541a traction motor. The cab has two identical crew compartments on both ends.

The main differences between EP08 and previous EU07 locomotives are as follows. First five units were equipped with plain bearings what proved insufficient for higher speeds and as a result all these locomotives were rebuilt as EU07 series (numbers 241 to 244). In later units roller bearing's were used.

Another significant change comparing to EU07 series was exchange of traction motors to newer EE541g type with higher isolation class. However, some solutions from EU07 locomotives which were rather faulty, were copied into this machine, like poor access to internal devices.

EU08 is suited for multiple steering work. Locomotive's cab resembles those of EU06 and EU07, but have different, orange and brown painting. Since June 2007 PKP Intercity has started repainting those machines into new, blue and white colours.

Nicknames
Świnia (Pig) - from its original orange painting.

References 

Pafawag locomotives
Bo′Bo′ locomotives
3000 V DC locomotives
Polish State Railways electric locomotives
Standard gauge locomotives of Poland
Bo′Bo′ electric locomotives of Europe